The 2023 Wichita mayoral election will be held on November 7, 2023, to elect the mayor of Wichita, Kansas. It will be preceded by a nonpartisan primary election on August 1. Incumbent Democratic mayor Brandon Whipple is running for re-election to a second term in office.

Candidates

Declared 
 Jared Cerullo, former city councilor (Party affiliation: Republican)
 Brian Frye, city councilor (Party affiliation: Republican)
 Anthony Gallardo, engineer (Party affiliation: Democratic)
 Chris Kane
 Celeste Racette, community activist and former Federal Deposit Insurance Corporation investigator (Party affiliation: Independent)
 Julie Stroud, environmental health specialist (Party affiliation: Independent)
 Brandon Whipple, incumbent mayor (Party affiliation: Democratic)

Withdrew 
 Irving Freige, U.S. Army veteran

Publicly expressed interest 
 Pete Meitzner, chair of the Sedgwick County commission and former city councilor (Party affiliation: Republican)
 Lily Wu, former TV news anchor

Declined 
 Jeff Blubaugh, city councilor (running for Sedgwick County commission, endorsed Frye)

Endorsements

References

Mayoral elections in Wichita, Kansas
2023 Kansas elections
Wichita